The 2016 Colorado Buffaloes football team represented the University of Colorado Boulder during the 2016 NCAA Division I FBS football season. Led by fourth-year head coach Mike MacIntyre, they played their home games on-campus at Folsom Field in Boulder and were members of the South Division of the Pac-12 Conference. They finished the season 10–4, 8–1 in Pac-12 play to win their first Pac-12 South Division Title. They represented the South Division in the 2016 Pac-12 Football Championship Game where they lost to Washington. They were invited to the Alamo Bowl where they lost to Oklahoma State. It was their first winning season since 2005.

Previous season
Colorado finished the 2015 season 4-9, 1-8 in Pac-12 play to finish in last place in the South Division.

Personnel

Schedule

Rankings

Game summaries

vs. Colorado State

Idaho State

at Michigan

at Oregon

Oregon State

at USC

Arizona State

at Stanford

UCLA

at Arizona

Washington State

Utah

vs Washington (Pac-12 Championship Game)

vs Oklahoma State (Alamo Bowl)

Awards and honors

References

Colorado
Colorado Buffaloes football seasons
Colorado Buffaloes football